Stadion im Brötzinger Tal is a stadium located in Pforzheim, Germany, which is used primarily by 1. CfR Pforzheim. It was built in 1913 and has a capacity of 10,000 people. The stadium hosted part of the European Monsters of Rock tour in 1987.

References

External links

Football venues in Germany
Sports venues in Baden-Württemberg